The following lists events that happened during 1958 in Cape Verde.

Incumbents
Colonial governor:
António Augusto Peixoto Correia
Silvino Silvério Marques

Events
TACV Cabo Verde Airlines established

Births
Cristina Fontes Lima, politician

References

 
1958 in the Portuguese Empire
Years of the 20th century in Cape Verde
1950s in Cape Verde
Cape Verde
Cape Verde